Hyponerita rosaceata is a moth of the subfamily Arctiinae. It was described by Watson and Goodger in 1986. It is found in Brazil.

References

Phaegopterina
Moths described in 1986